Applied Research Associates, Inc is a research and engineering company headquartered in Albuquerque, New Mexico, founded in 1979. As of 2018, its revenue was estimated at between $100 and $750 million by The Washington Post. As of 2011, it had approximately 1,600 employees.

History
The company was launched by Harry Auld and Neil Higgins in 1979 as Higgins, Auld and Bratton Inc. Jimmie Bratton joined the company in 1980 and the name was changed to Applied Research Associates, Inc.

In 2008, ARA assisted National Institute of Standards and Technology with their investigation into the collapse of original 7 World Trade Center in the September 11 attacks in 2001.

Sub-divisions

 Analytic, Software, and Engineering Solutions
Automation & Geosciences
Security Engineering & Applied Sciences
Software, Systems, and Modeling
Transportation, Infrastructure, and Energy
Klein Associates

Research

 National Security
 Integrated Munitions Effects Assessment (IMEA)
 Nuclear Capabilities Services (NuCS)
 Vulnerability Assessment and Protection Option (VAPO)
 Infrastructure
 Health Solutions
 BioGears Human Physiology Engine
 PTSD - A 2007-2008 pilot study by ARA found connections between traumatic brain injury and Posttraumatic stress disorder, contesting the notion that PTSD is primarily a psychological and not a physical affliction.
 Energy & Environment

Products

 Silent Sabre directed-energy weapon.
 MRZR X unmanned ground vehicle (with Polaris and Neya Systems).
 Modular Robotic Applique Kits (M-RAKs)
 ARC4 augmented reality system
 Aggregative Contingent Estimation System (ACES) crowdsourcing platform, funded by IARPA
 HURLOSS, a hurricane modelling system
 ReadiJet renewable biofuel (with Chevron Lummus Global)

References

1979 establishments in New Mexico
Companies based in Albuquerque, New Mexico
Employee-owned companies of the United States